Joyce Fante was an American poet and editor. She was married to writer John Fante from 1937 to his death in 1983.

Career
She was born in Placer County, California, the second daughter of Joseph and Louise Smart, Placer County pioneers. Her father was born in the small gold-mining Sierra Nevada town of Dutch Flat, son of Daniel Smart, who come to California in 1851 during the Gold Rush. Her mother, Louise Smart (born Louise Runchel), was a school teacher

Joyce Smart was raised in Roseville, California, and attended Stanford University. She wrote for The American Mercury, and played the piano. Fante and Joyce Smart met on January 30, 1937, and got married on July 31 of that same year in Reno, Nevada.

She was a resident of Mailbu for over 50 years.

Joyce died in 2005

References 

1913 births
2005 deaths
Stanford University alumni
Writers from California